Freeman is a city in Hutchinson County, South Dakota, United States. The population was 1,329 at the 2020 census.

Freeman was laid out in 1879.

Geography

Freeman has been assigned the ZIP code 57029 and the FIPS place code 23020.

Demographics

2010 census
As of the census of 2010, there were 1,306 people, 602 households, and 320 families living in the city. The racial makeup of the city was 94.3% White, 1.4% African American, 0.8% Native American, 0.2% Asian, 1.4% from other races, and 2.0% from two or more races. Hispanic or Latino of any race were 5.3% of the population.

There were 602 households, of which 23.4% had children under the age of 18 living with them, 44.5% were married couples living together, 6.1% had a female householder with no husband present, 2.5% had a male householder with no wife present, and 46.8% were non-families. 44.2% of all households were made up of individuals, and 29.9% had someone living alone who was 65 years of age or older. The average household size was 2.08 and the average family size was 2.93.

The median age in the city was 48.6 years. 22.1% of residents were under the age of 18; 5.9% were between the ages of 18 and 24; 17.8% were from 25 to 44; 22.7% were from 45 to 64; and 31.5% were 65 years of age or older. The gender makeup of the city was 44.5% male and 55.5% female.

2000 census
As of the census of 2000, there were 1,317 people, 602 households, and 364 families living in the city. The population density was 1,229.3 people per square mile (475.2/km2). There were 648 housing units at an average density of 604.8 per square mile (233.8/km2). The racial makeup of the city was 99.39% White, 0.08% African American, 0.38% Native American, and 0.15% from two or more races. Hispanic or Latino of any race were 0.15% of the population.

There were 602 households, out of which 21.4% had children under the age of 18 living with them, 52.7% were married couples living together, 5.6% had a female householder with no husband present, and 39.5% were non-families. 38.2% of all households were made up of individuals, and 25.9% had someone living alone who was 65 years of age or older. The average household size was 2.09 and the average family size was 2.78.

In the city, the population was spread out, with 19.7% under the age of 18, 4.7% from 18 to 24, 21.6% from 25 to 44, 19.1% from 45 to 64, and 34.9% who were 65 years of age or older. The median age was 48 years. For every 100 females, there were 80.9 males. For every 100 females age 18 and over, there were 74.7 males.

As of 2000 the median income for a household in the city was $29,152, and the median income for a family was $39,118. Males had a median income of $26,795 versus $17,788 for females. The per capita income for the city was $17,077. About 4.1% of families and 6.0% of the population were below the poverty line, including 6.1% of those under age 18 and 10.2% of those age 65 or over.

Notable person
Connor Hansen, Wisconsin Supreme Court justice

Education
Freeman High School and Freeman Elementary are the local public schools, home to the Freeman Flyers.

Freeman Junior College, started in 1903, was a small institution that begun the Mennonite-based education in Freeman. The Junior College closed in 1986, but the education continues on the campus as the Freeman Academy. The Freeman Academy is a private, Christian middle school and high school that serves students in grades 1-12.

Local culture
Freeman is considered the chislic capital of America and as such it is the location of The South Dakota Chislic Festival.  Local restaurants serve chislic as a local specialty.  
Schmeckfest was annually in Freeman from 1959 to 2019 but was canceled in 2020 and 2021 because of the coronavirus pandemic. Schmeckfest is considered one of South Dakota's premier festivals. It features the ethnic foods/culture/history and musical traditions of the community.
Heritage Hall Museum & Archives is an independent, not-for-profit museum in Freeman, preserving and sharing the history of the immigrants - primarily Germans from Russia - who settled in the area in the 1870s. It includes two large exhibit halls containing artifacts, an archives/library and four historic buildings. It is open year-round.

References

External links

 City of Freeman
 Freeman Community Development Corporation
 Freeman Public Schools
 Heritage Hall Museum & Archives

Cities in South Dakota
Cities in Hutchinson County, South Dakota
Populated places established in 1893
1893 establishments in South Dakota